Tewelde Estifanos Hidru (born 2 November 1981) is an Eritrean long distance runner who specialises in the marathon. He competed in the men's marathon event at the 2016 Summer Olympics where he finished in 60th place with a time of 2:19:12.

References

External links
 

1981 births
Living people
Eritrean male long-distance runners
Eritrean male marathon runners
Place of birth missing (living people)
Athletes (track and field) at the 2016 Summer Olympics
Olympic athletes of Eritrea
21st-century Eritrean people